Hiromi Takase is a Japanese politician who was a member of the House of Councillors of Japan.

Biography 
She was elected in 2016 but retired in 2022 due to health reasons.

References 

1981 births
Members of the House of Councillors (Japan)
Sōka University alumni
Living people